The Asylum Albums (1972–1975) is a four-disc box set by Canadian singer-songwriter Joni Mitchell, released on September 23, 2022, by Rhino Records. The set is the tenth overall release and second box set of remastered albums from the Joni Mitchell Archives, a planned series of releases featuring remastered and unreleased material from the singer's personal archives. Formatted in chronological order, the second volume of the remaster series includes Mitchell's first four albums released on Asylum Records: For the Roses (1972), Court and Spark (1974), Miles of Aisles (1974), and The Hissing of Summer Lawns (1975).

Background and recording
On September 10, 2020, Rhino Records announced the creation of the Joni Mitchell Archives, a planned years-long effort by Mitchell and her late manager Elliot Roberts to finally release and remaster previously unreleased recordings in Mitchell's archives. It was Rhino's intention to follow a certain release schedule, specifically stating that all "future releases in the archive series will arrive in a similar manner, with a box set focused on studio albums from a specific era, followed by an official 'Archives' release looking at unreleased audio from the same period." The 2021 release schedule for the Archives series followed said format, first with the release of The Reprise Albums (1968–1971) in June followed by the release of Joni Mitchell Archives – Vol. 2: The Reprise Years (1968–1971) in November. The record label committed to this release schedule again while announcing The Asylum Albums (1972–1975), albeit acknowledging the third volume of unreleased material would arrive the following year.

Like The Reprise Albums (1968–1971), The Asylum Albums (1972–1975) features original artwork by Mitchell, a picturesque scene painted in the Canadian wilderness that inspired For the Roses. The box set also features an essay written by Mitchell's friend, peer, and archival mentor Neil Young. All of the material on this release was remastered by series regular collaborator Bernie Grundman.
Mastering Error on Court and Spark {CD and Digital Versions} Track 4 - People's Parties segues into Same Situation and Same Situation repeats on track 5.

Track listing
All tracks are written by Joni Mitchell, except where noted.

Disc 1 – For the Roses (1972)

Disc 2 – Court and Spark (1974)

Disc 3 – Miles of Aisles (1974)

Disc 4 – The Hissing of Summer Lawns (1975)

Charts

References

Joni Mitchell albums
2022 albums